Dectocraspedon is a genus of moths of the family Erebidae. The genus was erected by Schaus in 1916.

Species
Dectocraspedon braziliensis Schaus, 1916
Dectocraspedon latefasciata Schaus, 1916
Dectocraspedon lichenea Hampson
Dectocraspedon obtusalis Schaus, 1916

References

Herminiinae